Gail's is a British bakery and cafe chain, with 100 shops, mostly in the London area.

Gail's was started in the 1990s by Gail Mejia, and opened its first bakery in Hampstead's High Street in 2005. Tom Molnar is the co-founder and CEO of Gail's and its parent company, Bread Holdings.

The chain is due to open in Wilmslow in early 2023, with further locations in the north-west of England set to be announced.

References

Coffeehouses and cafés in the United Kingdom
British bakers